Zoe Ellise Cooke (born 17 September 1995) is an Australian cricketer who plays as a right-arm medium pace bowler and right-handed batter for the ACT Meteors in the Women's National Cricket League, having previously represented them as a youngster before returning in 2018. She spent the 2018–19 Women's Big Bash League season with the Melbourne Renegades but did not make an appearance.

References

External links

Zoe Cooke at Cricket Australia

1995 births
Living people
Cricketers from the Australian Capital Territory
Australian women cricketers
ACT Meteors cricketers
Brisbane Heat (WBBL) cricketers
Melbourne Renegades (WBBL) cricketers